Debra J. Heffernan (born April 8, 1962) is an American politician. She is a Democratic member of the Delaware House of Representatives, representing District 6.

Heffernan earned her BS in biology from the University of Delaware and her MS in environmental toxicology from Duke University.

Heffernan is a part of the centrist wing of the Democratic Party. She supported centrist US Senator Tom Carper in the 2018 US Senate election in Delaware over progressive challenger Kerri Evelyn Harris. In 2022, she defeated progressive challenger Becca Cotto in the Democratic primary.

Electoral history
In 2010, Heffernan won the three-way general election with 4,363 votes (51.9%) against incumbent Republican Tom Kovach and Libertarian nominee Matthew Flebbe. She was one of only ten candidates to defeat a sitting Republican in a state house race in 2010 according to Ballotpedia.
In 2012, Heffernan won the general election with 7,502 votes (62.4%) against Republican nominee Eric Taylor.
In 2014, Heffernan won the general election with 4,496 votes (63.4%) against Republican nominee Kyle Buzzard.
In 2016, Heffernan was unopposed in the general election and won 9,545 votes.
In 2018, Heffernan won the general election with 7,073 (65.3%) against Republican nominee Jeffrey Olmstead.

References

External links
Official page at the Delaware General Assembly
Campaign site
 

Place of birth missing (living people)
1962 births
Living people
Democratic Party members of the Delaware House of Representatives
Women state legislators in Delaware
21st-century American women politicians
21st-century American politicians
People from New Castle County, Delaware
University of Delaware alumni
Duke University alumni